Senator Case may refer to:

Members of the United States Senate
Clifford P. Case (1904–1982), U.S. Senator from New Jersey from 1955 to 1979
Francis H. Case (1896–1962), U.S. Senator from South Dakota from 1951 to 1962

United States state senate members
Cale Case (born 1958), Wyoming State Senate
Clarence E. Case (1877–1961), New Jersey State Senate
Jerome Case (1819–1891), Wisconsin State Senate
John Higley Case (1832–1890), Minnesota  State Senate
Leon D. Case (1877–1939), Michigan State Senate